1349 is a Norwegian black metal band from Oslo, Norway, formed in 1997. The band's name is a reference to the year the Black Death reached Norway.

History 
1349 formed in 1997 and comprises several former members of the band Alvheim. Drummer Frost is also a member of Satyricon.

In recognition of 1349's influences, the band performed a cover of Mayhem's "Buried by Time and Dust" on their debut album, Liberation. At 1349's live shows, the band has also covered Celtic Frost, whom vocalist Ravn cites as his principal influence.

1349 tours on a regular basis. The band's live shows often begin with Frost and guitarist Archaon breathing fire. In 2006, 1349 toured the US with Celtic Frost. Ravn also appeared on the Celtic Frost album Monotheist (2006), performing guest vocals on the CD digipack bonus track, "Temple of Depression". In 2007, during the French Hellfest festival, 1349 was slated to play during the day, but asked to reschedule their appearance to play in the dark instead. During 1349's appearance at the Oslo Inferno Metal Festival in March 2008, the band was joined on stage by Celtic Frost frontman Tom Gabriel Fischer for a rendition of the Celtic Frost song "The Usurper". In September 2008, 1349 toured with Carcass, Suffocation, Aborted and Rotten Sound on the Exhume to Consume Tour.

A music video for "Sculptor of Flesh" was made following the release of Hellfire (2005). The video, directed by Judd Tilyard, alternates between footage of the band performing the song in Norway and clips of surgery filmed in Australia.

During late 2008, 1349 recorded its fourth album, Revelations of the Black Flame. The album was co-mixed by Tom Gabriel Fischer, and was released in Europe on 25 May 2009. Revelations of the Black Flame marked a change in direction for the band, as songs on the album were slower than previous releases, and there were also some dark ambient and industrial-tinged tracks.

At the beginning of 2010 the band signed a contract with Indie Recordings for the release of its fifth album in Europe, with Prosthetic Records distributing the album in North America.

1349 toured with Cannibal Corpse, Skeletonwitch, and Lecherous Nocturne on the Evisceration Plague Tour, in April–May 2010. The band also performed at the Wacken Open Air and Summer Breeze Open Air festivals in August 2010.

1349 released its fifth album, Demonoir, on 26 April 2010. The album shows a return to 1349's earlier sound, before Revelations of the Black Flame, while continuing the low-fi production and ambient sensibilities of Revelations. 1349 toured Canada and the United States with Tom Gabriel Fischer's project Triptykon in October 2010. A deluxe box set of Demonoir was released in October 2011. The band's first live DVD, titled Hellvetia Fire – The Official 1349 Bootleg, was released on 24 October 2011 by Candlelight Records. It was filmed at Bikini Test La Chaux De Fonds in Switzerland in 2005.

In October 2013, the band began recording their sixth studio album, called Massive Cauldron of Chaos. On 10 December, the band announced that the record was finished, and it was released on 29 September 2014, via Indie Recordings.

In February 2017, it was announced that 1349 have now signed to Season of Mist and are now said to be in the process of writing their seventh studio album, which is set to be released in 2019. The first new single from the as yet untitled new album, 'Dødskamp' was released digitally on 14 January 2019.  On 31 July 2019 it was revealed that the band's seventh Studio album would be titled 'The Infernal Pathway'. It was released on 18 October 2019.

Members

Current members
 Olav "Ravn" Bergene – lead vocals (1997–present), drums (1997–2000)
 Tor Risdal "Seidemann" Stavenes – bass, backing vocals (1997–present)
 Idar "Archaon" Burheim – guitars, backing vocals (1999–present)
 Kjetil-Vidar "Frost" Haraldstad – drums (2000–present)

Former members
 Lars "Balfori" Larsen – guitars (1997–1998)
 André "Tjalve" Kvebek – guitars (1997–2006)

Touring members
 Tony Laureano – drums (2006)
 Morten "Teloch" Iversen – guitars (2006–2007)
 Mads Guldbekkhei – drums (2007–2008)
 Thor "Destructhor" Anders Myhren – guitars (2008, 2015)
 Tony "Secthdamon" Ingibergsson – guitars, backing vocals (2009, 2016–present)
 Jon "The Charn" Rice – drums (2012)
 Sondre Drangsland – drums (2014–2018)
 Nils "Dominator" Fjellström – drums (2018–present)

Timeline

Discography

Studio albums
 Liberation (2003)
 Beyond the Apocalypse (2004)
 Hellfire (2005)
 Revelations of the Black Flame (2009)
 Demonoir (2010)
 Massive Cauldron of Chaos (2014)
 The Infernal Pathway (2019)

EP
 1349 (2001)
 Dødskamp (2019)

Demos
 Demo (1998)
 Chaos Preferred (1999)

DVD
 Hellvetia Fire – The Official 1349 Bootleg DVD (2011)

References

External links 

 

Norwegian black metal musical groups
Musical groups established in 1997
1997 establishments in Norway
Musical quartets
Musical groups from Oslo
Candlelight Records artists
Season of Mist artists

ms:1349 (nombor)